Arroyo Aguaje de la Petaca is a stream or arroyo in Taos County, and Rio Arriba County, New Mexico.

References 

Rivers of Rio Arriba County, New Mexico
Rivers of Taos County, New Mexico